This discography of rock music singer-songwriter Liz Phair consists of seven studio albums, three extended plays, eighteen singles, three compilations, two video albums, seventeen music videos and one box set. She recorded three self-produced cassettes as Girly Sound in the early 1990s.

Albums

Studio albums

Compilation albums

Demo albums

Extended plays

Singles

As lead artist

A.  "Insanity" charted only on the Hot Digital Tracks chart, peaking at number 5.
B.  Charted at number 11 on the Bubbling Under Hot 100 Singles chart, a 25-song extension to the Billboard Hot 100.
 "Why Can't I?" charted on Billboards Top 40 Tracks chart in 2004, peaking at number 15
 "Why Can't I?" charted on Billboards Top 40 Adult Recurrent chart in 2004, peaking at number 1
 "Polyester Bride" was an international commercial single in Japan only and a promotional single in the US and Europe.

Promotional singles

As featured artist

B-sides

Other contributions

Videography

Video albums

Music videos

Notes

References

External links
 

Discographies of American artists
Alternative rock discographies